Roy Malcolm Gearry (born 18 December 1946) is a former New Zealand cricketer who played 11 games of first-class cricket for Canterbury and Central Districts between 1964 and 1973. His highest first-class score was 59 for Canterbury in a 10-wicket victory over Northern Districts in his last first-class match in December 1973. His father George Gearry played for Canterbury in the 1950s.

References

External links
 
Roy Gearry at CricketArchive

1946 births
Living people
New Zealand cricketers
Cricketers from Christchurch
Canterbury cricketers
Central Districts cricketers